The Choice (also known as Al-ikhtiyar) is a 1970 Egyptian drama and mystery film directed by Youssef Chahine.The film stars Soad Hosny, Ezzat El Alaili and Mahmoud El-Meliguy in the lead roles.

Cast
 Soad Hosny
 Ezzat El Alaili
 Mahmoud El-Meliguy
 Seif El Dine
 Seif Eddine Shawkat

References

External links
 

1970s Arabic-language films
1970 films
1970s mystery drama films
Egyptian mystery drama films
1970 drama films
Films directed by Youssef Chahine